John L. Myers (October 17, 1947 – December 6, 2015) was a Democratic member of the Pennsylvania House of Representatives, representing the 201st District. He served from 1995 through 2013.

References

External links
Pennsylvania House of Representatives - John Myers official PA House website
Project Vote Smart - Representative John L. Myers (PA) profile
Follow the Money - John Myers
2006 2004 2002 2000 1998 campaign contributions
Pennsylvania House Democratic Caucus - Rep. John Myers official Party website

Democratic Party members of the Pennsylvania House of Representatives
1947 births
2015 deaths
Politicians from Philadelphia